The 17th Annual Australian Recording Industry Association Music Awards (generally known as ARIA Music Awards) were held on 21 October 2003 at the Sydney Superdome. The ceremony aired on Network Ten.

Awards
Winners highlighted in bold, with nominees, in plain, below them.

ARIA Awards
Album of the Year
Powderfinger – Vulture Street
Delta Goodrem – Innocent Eyes
The Sleepy Jackson – Lovers
Something for Kate – The Official Fiction
The Waifs – Up All Night
Single of the Year
Delta Goodrem – "Born to Try"
Amiel – "Lovesong"
Powderfinger – "(Baby I've Got You) On My Mind"
Silverchair – "Luv Your Life"
The Waifs – "Lighthouse"
Best Male Artist
Alex Lloyd – "Coming Home"
Ben Lee – Hey You. Yes You.
John Butler – Living
Nick Cave – Nocturama
Tex Perkins – Sweet Nothing
Best Female Artist
Delta Goodrem – Innocent Eyes
Amiel – Audio Out
Kylie Minogue – "Come into My World"
Renée Geyer – Tenderland
Sarah Blasko - Prelusive EP ("Your Way")
Best Group
Powderfinger – Vulture Street
Grinspoon – "No Reason"
Silverchair – "Across the Night"
Something for Kate – The Official Fiction
The Waifs – Up All Night
Highest Selling Single
Delta Goodrem – "Born to Try"
Amiel – "Lovesong"
The Androids – "Do It with Madonna"
Delta Goodrem – "Innocent Eyes"
Delta Goodrem – "Lost Without You"
Highest Selling Album
Delta Goodrem – Innocent Eyes
John Farnham – The Last Time
Kasey Chambers – Barricades & Brickwalls
Powderfinger – Vulture Street
Silverchair – Diorama
Breakthrough Artist – Single
Delta Goodrem – "Born to Try"
Candice Alley – "Falling"
The Casanovas – "Shake It"
Rogue Traders – "One of My Kind"
The Sleepy Jackson – "Vampire Racecourse"
Breakthrough Artist – Album
Delta Goodrem – Innocent Eyes
Amiel – Audio Out
Pete Murray – Feeler
The Sleepy Jackson – Lovers
The Waifs – Up All Night
Best Independent Release
The Waifs – Up All Night
1200 Techniques – "Eye of the Storm"
Diesel – Hear
John Butler Trio – Living
The Mess Hall – Feeling Sideways
Best Adult Contemporary Album
John Farnham – The Last Time
Blackeyed Susans – Shangri-La
David Bridie – Hotel Radio
The Go-Betweens – Bright Yellow Bright Orange
Renée Geyer – Tenderland
Best Rock Album
Powderfinger – Vulture Street
Magic Dirt – Tough Love
Nick Cave and the Bad Seeds – Nocturama
The Sleepy Jackson – Lovers
Something for Kate – The Official Fiction
Best Country Album
Keith Urban – Golden Road
Adam Harvey – Cowboy Dreams
Beccy Cole – Little Victories
Bill Chambers – Sleeping with the Blues
Sara Storer – Beautiful Circle
Best Blues & Roots Album
The Waifs – Up All Night
John Butler Trio – Living
Mia Dyson – Cold Water
Pete Murray – Feeler
The Revelators – The Revelators
Best Pop Release
Delta Goodrem – Innocent Eyes
Amiel – Audio Out
The Androids – "Do It with Madonna"
Dannii Minogue – Neon Nights
Kylie Minogue – "Come into My World"
Best Dance Release
Rogue Traders – "One of My Kind"
1200 Techniques – "Eye of the Storm"
Disco Montego – Disco Montego
Gerling – "Who's Ya Daddy?"
Wicked Beat Sound System – New Soul Breaks
Best Children's Album
Hi-5 –  Celebrate
Play School – Hip Hip Hooray
The Saddle Club – On Top of the World
The Wiggles - Go to Sleep Jeff!
The Wiggles - Whoo Hoo! Wiggly Gremlins! 
Best Comedy Release
Merrick and Rosso – From Us to Youse
Dave Hughes – Whatever
The Drugs – Music's in Trouble
Rodney Rude – Rude Bastard
Tripod – About an Hour of Song in an Hour

Artisan Awards
Best Cover Art
Steven Gorrow, Revolution Design – Powderfinger – Vulture Street
Jenny Sullivan, Sony Music Design – Delta Goodrem – Innocent Eyes
Adalita, Steven Gorrow – Magic Dirt – Tough Love
Stephanie Ashworth & David Homer, Sony Music Design – Something for Kate – The Official Fiction
James Bellesini, Love Police – You Am I – Deliverance
Engineer of the Year
Chris Thompson – The Waifs – Up All Night
Vince Pizzinga – Delta Goodrem – Innocent Eyes
David Leonard – The Butterfly Effect – Begins Here
Lindsay Gravina – Magic Dirt – Tough Love
Paul McKercher – Pete Murray – Feeler
Best Video
Bart Borghesi – The Androids – "Do It with Madonna"
Paul Butler, Scott Walton & 50 / 50 Films – Gerling – "Who's Ya Daddy?"
Paul Butler, Scott Walton & 50 / 50 Films – Powderfinger – "(Baby I've Got You) On My Mind"
Sam Bennetts, Rising Sun Pictures – Rogue Traders – "One of My Kind"
Sean Gilligan & Sarah-Jane Woulahan – Silverchair – "Across the Night"
Producer of the Year
Chris Thompson – The Waifs – Up All Night
David Nicholas – Delta Goodrem – Innocent Eyes
Jonathan Burnside – The Sleepy Jackson – Lovers
Magoo – Gerling – Bad Blood
Paul McKercher – Pete Murray – Feeler

Fine Arts Awards
Best World Music Album
Monsieur Camembert – Absynthe
All India Radio – All India Radio
David Bridie – West Papua: Sound of the Morning Star
Kavisha Mazzella – Silverhook Tango
Zulya – Elusive
Best Jazz Album
Andrea Keller – Mikrokosmos
Andrew Robson – On
Kevin Hunt Trio – Love Walked In
The Necks – Athenaeum, Homebush, Quay & Raab
The World According to James – Wayback
Best Original Soundtrack Recording
Mick Harvey – Australian Rules
Cezary Skubiszewski – After The Deluge (Original Television Mini-series Soundtrack)
Dave Graney & Clare Moore – Music from the Motion Picture - Bad Eggs
The Saddle Club – On Top of the World
Various Artists – The Secret Life of Us Volume 3
Best Original Cast/Show Recording
Various Artists - Long Way To The Top - Live In Concert
Best Classical AlbumSaffire – Saffire - The Australian Guitar Quartet
Marshall McGuire – The 20th Century Harp
Slava Grigoryan, Leonard Grigoryan – Play
Teddy Tahu Rhodes – Mozart Arias
Yvonne Kenny – Make Believe

ARIA Hall of Fame Inductee
Inducted into the ARIA Hall of Fame was:John FarnhamOutstanding Achievement AwardThe WigglesChannel V Oz Artist of the Year awardDelta Goodrem'''
Silverchair
Powderfinger
Something For Kate
Grinspoon

See also
Australian music

References

ARIA Music Awards
2003 in Australian music
2003 music awards